The woodland Oldfield mouse (Thomasomys hylophilus) is a species of rodent in the family Cricetidae.
It is found in Colombia and Venezuela.

References

Musser, G. G. and M. D. Carleton. 2005. Superfamily Muroidea. pp. 894–1531 in Mammal Species of the World a Taxonomic and Geographic Reference. D. E. Wilson and D. M. Reeder eds. Johns Hopkins University Press, Baltimore.

Thomasomys
Mammals of Colombia
Mammals of Venezuela
Mammals described in 1912
Taxonomy articles created by Polbot